Eirik Milde (born 20 May 1958) is a Norwegian politician for the Conservative Party. He was elected to the Parliament of Norway from Østfold in 2013 where he is member of the Standing Committee on Energy and the Environment.

References 

Conservative Party (Norway) politicians
Members of the Storting
Østfold politicians
1958 births
Living people
21st-century Norwegian politicians